London Trams, previously Tramlink and Croydon Tramlink, is a light rail tram system serving Croydon and surrounding areas in South London, England. It began operation in 2000, the first tram system in the London region since 1952. It is managed by London Trams, a public body part of Transport for London (TfL), and has been operated by FirstGroup since 2017. Tramlink is one of two light rail networks in Greater London, the other being the Docklands Light Railway.

The network consists of 39 stops along  of track, on a mixture of street track shared with other traffic, dedicated track in public roads, and off-street track consisting of new rights-of-way, former railway lines, and one right-of-way where the Tramlink track runs parallel to a third rail-electrified Network Rail line.

The network's lines coincide in central Croydon, with eastern termini at Beckenham Junction, Elmers End and New Addington, and a western terminus at Wimbledon, where there is an interchange for London Underground. Tramlink is the fourth-busiest light rail network in the UK behind the Docklands Light Railway, Manchester Metrolink and Tyne and Wear Metro.

History

Inception
In the first half of the 20th century, Croydon had many tramlines. The first to close was the Addiscombe – East Croydon station route through George Street to Cherry Orchard Road in 1927 and the last was the Purley - Embankment and Croydon (Coombe Road) - Thornton Heath routes closed April 1951. However, in the Spring of 1950, the Highways Committee were presented by the Mayor with the concept of running trams between East Croydon station and the new estate being constructed at New Addington. This was based on the fact that the Feltham cars used in Croydon were going to Leeds to serve their new estates on reserved tracks. In 1962, a private study with assistance from BR engineers, showed how easy it was to convert the West Croydon - Wimbledon train service to tram operation and successfully prevent conflict between trams and trains.

These two concepts became joined in joint LRTL/TLRS concept of New Addington to Wimbledon every 15 minutes via East and West Croydon and Mitcham plus New Addington to Tattenham Corner every 15 minutes via East and West Croydon, Sutton and Epsom Downs. A branch into Forestdale to give an overlap service from Sutton was also included. During the 1970s, several BR directors and up-and-coming managers were aware of the advantages.  Chris Green, upon becoming managing director, Network South East, published his plans in 1987 expanding the concept to take in the Tattenham Corner and Caterham branches and provide a service from Croydon to Lewisham via Addiscombe and Hayes. Working with Tony Ridley, then managing director, London Transport, the scheme was brought out into the open with Scott McIntosh being appointed Light Rail Manager in 1989.

The scheme was accepted in principle in February 1990 by Croydon Council who worked with what was then London Regional Transport (LRT) to propose Tramlink to Parliament. The Croydon Tramlink Act 1994 resulted, which gave LRT the power to build and run Tramlink.

Part of its track is the original route of the Surrey Iron Railway that opened in 1803.

Construction
In 1995 four consortia were shortlisted to build, operate and maintain Tramlink:
 Altram: John Laing, Ansaldo, Serco
 Croydon Connect: Tarmac, AEG, Transdev
 CT Light Rail Group: GEC Alsthom, Mowlem, Welsh Water
 Tramtrack Croydon: CentreWest, Royal Bank of Scotland, Sir Robert McAlpine, Amey, Bombardier Transportation

In 1996 Tramtrack Croydon (TC) won a 99-year Private Finance Initiative (PFI) contract to design, build, operate and maintain Tramlink. The equity partners in TC were Amey (50%), Royal Bank of Scotland (20%), 3i (20%) and Sir Robert McAlpine with Bombardier Transportation contracted to build and maintain the trams and FirstGroup operate the service. TC retained the revenue generated by Tramlink and LRT had to pay compensation to TC for any changes to the fares and ticketing policy introduced later.

Construction work started in January 1997, with an expected opening in November 1999. The first tram was delivered in October 1998 to the new Depot at Therapia Lane and testing on the sections of the Wimbledon line began shortly afterwards.

Opening
The official opening of Tramlink took place on 10 May 2000 when route 3 from Croydon to New Addington opened to the public. Route 2 from Croydon to Beckenham Junction followed on 23 May 2000, and route 1 from Elmers End to Wimbledon opened a week later on 30 May 2000.

Buyout by Transport for London
In March 2008, TfL announced that it had reached agreement to buy TC for £98 million. The purchase was finalised on 28 June 2008. The background to this purchase relates to the requirement that TfL (who took over from London Regional Transport in 2000) compensates TC for the consequences of any changes to the fares and ticketing policy introduced since 1996. In 2007 that payment was £4m, with an annual increase in rate. FirstGroup continues to operate the service.

In October 2008 TfL introduced a new livery, using the blue, white and green of the routes on TfL maps, to distinguish the trams from buses operating in the area. The colour of the cars was changed to green, and the brand name was changed from Croydon Tramlink to simply Tramlink. These refurbishments were completed in early 2009.

Additional stop and trams
Centrale tram stop, in Tamworth Road on the one-way central loop, opened on 10 December 2005, increasing journey times slightly. As turnround times were already quite tight, this raised the issue of buying an extra tram to maintain punctuality. Partly for this reason but also to take into account the planned restructuring of services (subsequently introduced in July 2006), TfL issued tenders for a new tram. However, nothing resulted from this.

In January 2011, Tramtrack Croydon opened a tender for the supply of 10 new or second-hand trams from the end of summer 2011, for use between Therapia Lane and Elmers End. On 18 August 2011, TfL announced that Stadler Rail had won a $19.75 million contract to supply six Variobahn trams similar to those used by Bybanen in Bergen, Norway. They entered service in 2012. In August 2013, TfL ordered an additional four Variobahns for delivery in 2015, for use on the Wimbledon to Croydon link, an order later increased to six. This brought the total Variobahn fleet up to ten in 2015, and twelve in 2016 when the final two trams were delivered.

Current network

Stops

There are 39 stops, with 38 opened in the initial phase, and Centrale tram stop added on 10 December 2005. This allows wheelchairs, prams, pushchairs and the elderly to board the tram easily with no steps. In street sections, the stop is integrated with the pavement.
They are unstaffed and had automated ticket machines that are no longer in use due to TfL making trams cashless. In general, access between the platforms involves crossing the tracks by pedestrian level crossing.

Tramlink uses some former main-line stations on the Wimbledon–West Croydon and Elmers End–Coombe Lane stretches of line. The railway platforms have been demolished and rebuilt to Tramlink specifications, except at Elmers End and Wimbledon where the track level was raised to meet the higher main-line platforms to enable cross-platform interchange.

All stops have disabled access, raised paving, CCTV, a Passenger Help Point, a Passenger Information Display (PID), litter bins, a ticket machine, a noticeboard and lamp-posts, and most also have seats and a shelter.

The PIDs display the destinations and expected arrival times of the next two trams. They can also display any message the controllers want to display, such as information on delays or even safety instructions for vandals to stop putting rubbish or other objects onto the track.

Routes

Tramlink has been shown on the principal tube map since 1 June 2016, having previously appeared only on the "London Connections" map.

When Tramlink first opened it had three routes: Line 1 (yellow) from Wimbledon to Elmers End, Line 2 (red) from Croydon to Beckenham Junction, and Line 3 (green) from Croydon to New Addington. On 23 July 2006 the network was restructured, with Route 1 from Elmers End to Croydon, Route 2 from Beckenham Junction to Croydon and Route 3 from New Addington to Wimbledon. On 25 June 2012 Route 4 from Therapia Lane to Elmers End was introduced. On Monday 4 April 2016, Route 4 was extended from Therapia Lane to Wimbledon.

On 25 February 2018, the network and timetables were restructured again for more even and reliable services. As part of this change, trams would no longer display route numbers on their dot matrix destination screens. This resulted in three routes:
 New Addington to West Croydon, returning to New Addington every 7–8 minutes (every 10 minutes on Sunday shopping hours and every 15 minutes at late evenings).
 Wimbledon to Beckenham Junction every 10 minutes (every 15 minutes on Sundays and late evening)
 Wimbledon to Elmers End every 10 minutes (every 15 minutes on Sundays and terminates at Croydon in late evening every 15 minutes)

Additionally, the first two trams from New Addington will run to Wimbledon. Overall, this would result in a decrease in 2tph leaving Elmers End, resulting in a 25% decrease in capacity here, and 14% in the Addiscombe area. However, this would also regulate waiting times in this area and on the Wimbledon branch to every 5 minutes, from every 2–7 minutes.

Former lines reused

Tramlink makes use of a number of National Rail lines, running parallel to franchised services, or in some cases, runs on previously abandoned railway corridors. Between Birkbeck and Beckenham Junction, Tramlink uses the Crystal Palace line, running on a single track alongside the track carrying Southern rail services. The National Rail track had been singled some years earlier.

From Elmers End to Woodside, Tramlink follows the former Addiscombe Line. At Woodside, the old station buildings stand disused, and the original platforms have been replaced by accessible low platforms. Tramlink then follows the former Woodside and South Croydon Railway (W&SCR) to reach the current Addiscombe tram stop, adjacent to the site of the demolished Bingham Road railway station. It continues along the former railway route to near Sandilands, where Tramlink curves sharply towards Sandilands tram stop. Another route from Sandilands tram stop curves sharply on to the W&SCR before passing through Park Hill (or Sandilands) tunnels and to the site of Coombe Road station after which it curves away across Lloyd Park.

Between Wimbledon station and Wandle Park, Tramlink follows the former West Croydon to Wimbledon Line, which was first opened in 1855 and closed on 31 May 1997 to allow for conversion into Tramlink. Within this section, from near Phipps Bridge to near Reeves Corner, Tramlink follows the Surrey Iron Railway, giving Tramlink a claim to one of the world's oldest railway alignments. Beyond Wandle Park, a Victorian footbridge beside Waddon New Road was dismantled to make way for the flyover over the West Croydon to Sutton railway line. The footbridge has been re-erected at Corfe Castle station on the Swanage Railway (although some evidence suggests that this was a similar footbridge removed from the site of Merton Park railway station).

Feeder buses
Bus routes T31, T32 and T33 used to connect with Tramlink at the New Addington, Fieldway and Addington Village stops. T31 and T32 no longer run, and T33 has been renumbered as 433.

Rolling stock

Current fleet
Tramlink currently uses 35 trams.  In summary:

Bombardier CR4000

The original fleet comprised 24 articulated low floor Bombardier Flexity Swift CR4000 trams built in Vienna numbered beginning at 2530, continuing from the highest-numbered tram 2529 on London's former tram network, which closed in 1952. The original livery was red and white. One (2550) was painted in FirstGroup white, blue and pink livery. In 2006, the CR4000 fleet was refreshed, with the bus-style destination roller blinds being replaced with a digital dot-matrix display. In 2008/09 the fleet was repainted externally in the new green livery and the interiors were refurbished with new flooring, seat covers retrimmed in a new moquette and stanchions repainted from yellow to green. One (2551) has not returned to service after the fatal accident on 9 November 2016.

In 2007, tram 2535 was named after Steven Parascandolo, a well known tram enthusiast.

Croydon Variobahn

In January 2011, Tramtrack Croydon invited tenders for the supply of then new or second-hand trams, and on 18 August 2011, TfL announced that Stadler Rail had won a $19.75million contract to supply six Variobahn trams similar to those used by Bybanen in Bergen, Norway. They entered service in 2012. In August 2013, TfL ordered an additional four Variobahn trams for delivery in 2015, an order which was later increased to six. This brought the total Variobahn fleet up to ten in 2015, and 12 in 2016 when the final two trams were delivered.

Ancillary vehicles
Engineers' vehicles used in Tramlink construction were hired for that purpose.

In November 2006 Tramlink purchased five second-hand engineering vehicles from Deutsche Bahn. These were two  engineers' trams (numbered 058 and 059 in Tramlink service), and three 4-wheel wagons (numbered 060, 061, and 062). Service tram 058 and trailer 061 were both sold to the National Tramway Museum in 2010.

Fares and ticketing

TfL Bus & Tram Passes are valid on Tramlink, as are Travelcards that include any of zones 3, 4, 5 and 6.

Pay-as-you-go Oyster Card fares are the same as on London Buses, although special fares may apply when using Tramlink feeder buses.

When using Oyster cards, passengers must touch in on the platform before boarding the tram. Special arrangements apply at Wimbledon station, where the Tramlink stop is within the National Rail and London Underground station. Tramlink passengers must therefore touch in at the station entry barriers then again at the Tramlink platform to inform the system that no mainline/LUL rail journey has been made.

EMV contactless payment cards can also be used to pay for fares in the same manner as Oyster cards.
Ticket machines were withdrawn on 16 July 2018.

Services

Onboard announcements
The onboard announcements are by BBC News reader (and tram enthusiast) Nicholas Owen. The announcement pattern is as follows: e.g. This tram is for Wimbledon; the next stop will be Merton Park.

Corporate affairs

Ownership and structure
The service was created as a result of the Croydon Tramlink Act 1994 that received Royal Assent on 21 July 1994, a Private Bill jointly promoted by London Regional Transport (the predecessor of Transport for London (TfL)) and Croydon London Borough Council. Following a competitive tender, a consortium company Tramtrack Croydon Limited (incorporated in 1995) was awarded a 99-year concession to build and run the system.  Since 28 June 2008, the company has been a subsidiary of TfL.

Tramlink is currently operated by Tram Operations Ltd (TOL), a subsidiary of FirstGroup, who have a contract to operate the service until 2030. TOL provides the drivers and management to operate the service; the infrastructure and trams are owned and maintained by a TfL subsidiary.

Business trends

The key available trends in recent years for Tramlink are (years ending 31 March):

Activities in the financial year 2020/21 were severely reduced by the impact of the coronavirus pandemic.

Passenger numbers
Detailed passenger journeys since Tramlink commenced operations in May 2000 were:

Future developments

Sutton Link

As of 2020, the only extension actively being pursued by the Mayor of London and TfL is a new line to Sutton from Wimbledon or Colliers Wood, known as the Sutton Link.

In July 2013, then Mayor Boris Johnson had affirmed that there was a reasonable business case for Tramlink to cover the Wimbledon – Sutton corridor, which might also include a loop via St Helier Hospital and an extension to The Royal Marsden Hospital.  In 2014, a proposed £320m scheme for a new line to connect Wimbledon to Sutton via Morden was made and brought to consultation jointly by the London Boroughs of Merton and Sutton. Although £100m from TfL was initially secured in the draft 2016/17 budget, this was subsequently reallocated.

In 2018, TfL opened a consultation on proposals for a connection to Sutton, with three route options: from South Wimbledon, from Colliers Wood (both having an option of a bus rapid transit route or a tram line) or from Wimbledon (only as a tram line).  In February 2020, following the consultation, TfL announced their preference for a north–south tramway between Colliers Wood and Sutton town centre, with a projected cost of £425m, on the condition of securing additional funding. Work on the project stopped in July 2020, as Transport for London could not find sufficient funding for it to continue.

Previous proposals
Numerous extensions to the network have been discussed or proposed over the years, involving varying degrees of support and investigative effort.

In 2002, as part of The Mayor's Transport Strategy for London, a number of proposed extensions were identified, including to Sutton from Wimbledon or Mitcham; to Crystal Palace; to Colliers Wood/Tooting; and along the A23. The Strategy said that "extensions to the network could, in principle, be developed at relatively modest cost where there is potential demand..." and sought initial views on the viability of a number of extensions by summer 2002.

In 2006, in a TfL consultation on an extension to Crystal Palace, three options were presented: on-street, off-street and a mixture of the two. After the consultation, the off-street option was favoured, to include Crystal Palace Station and Crystal Palace Parade. TfL stated in 2008 that due to lack of funding the plans for this extension would not be taken forward. They were revived shortly after Boris Johnson's re-election as Mayor in May 2012, but six months later they were cancelled again.

In November 2014, a 15-year plan, Trams 2030, called for upgrades to increase capacity on the network in line with an expected increase in ridership to 60 million passengers by 2031 (although the passenger numbers at the time (2013/14: 31.2 million) have not been exceeded since (as at 2019)).
The upgrades were to improve reliability, support regeneration in the Croydon metropolitan centre, and future-proof the network for Crossrail 2, a potential Bakerloo line extension, and extensions to the tram network itself to a wide variety of destinations. The plans involve dual-tracking across the network and introducing diverting loops on either side of Croydon, allowing for a higher frequency of trams on all four branches without increasing congestion in central Croydon. The £737m investment was to be funded by the Croydon Growth Zone, TfL Business Plan, housing levies, and the respective boroughs, and by the affected developers.

All the various developments, if implemented, could theoretically require an increase in the fleet from 30 to up to 80 trams (depending on whether longer trams or coupled trams are used). As such, an increase in depot and stabling capacity would also be required; enlargement of the current Therapia Lane site, as well as sites near the Elmers End and Harrington Road tram stops, were shortlisted.

Accidents and incidents

 On 7 September 2008, a bus on route 468 travelled through a red traffic signal and collided with tram 2534 in George Street, Croydon, causing a fatality. The driver of the bus was convicted of causing death by dangerous driving a year later in December 2009 and was sentenced to four years in prison.
 On 13 September 2008, tram 2530 collided with a cyclist at Morden Hall Park footpath crossing between the Morden Road and Phipps Bridge tram stops. The cyclist sustained serious injuries and later died. The immediate cause of the accident was found to be that the cyclist rode onto the crossing without looking at the approaching tram; among the causal factors were that the cyclist may have been wearing headphones, which prevented him hearing the audible warnings.
 On 5 April 2011, a woman tripped over and was dragged under a moving tram. She was taken to hospital in a serious condition. She is believed to have been running to catch the tram outside East Croydon station when she tripped and fell.
 On 17 February 2012, a tram derailed after passing over facing points as it approached the platform at East Croydon station.
 On 7 February 2016, 5 people were injured when a car collided with tram 2535, which was going round a bend near Wellesley Road. It resulted in the tram being derailed.
The British Transport Police arrested the driver on suspicion of manslaughter. Driver error was found to be the cause of the accident, with suspicions that the driver had a microsleep episode approaching the bend.

See also

 East London Transit (proposed for tram conversion)
 List of modern tramway and light rail systems in the United Kingdom
 List of town tramway systems in the United Kingdom

References

Further reading

External links

 

 
Transport in the London Borough of Bromley
Transport in the London Borough of Croydon
Transport in the London Borough of Merton
Transport in the London Borough of Sutton
Light rail in the United Kingdom
Trams in London
Tram transport in England
Croydon 2020
Railway lines opened in 2000
Modes of transport in London
Electric railways in the United Kingdom
Standard gauge railways in London
750 V DC railway electrification